Gymnocoronis spilanthoides, also known by its common name Senegal tea or Senegal tea plant  is a species from the genus Gymnocoronis. The species was first described by Augustin Pyramus de Candolle.

In Europe, the species features since 2019 on the list of Invasive Alien Species of Union Concern. This means that import of the species and trade in the species is forbidden in the whole of the European Union.

References

Eupatorieae